Joseph Bartholomew may refer to:

 Joseph Bartholomew (judge) (1843–1901), American judge in North Dakota
 Joseph Bartholomew (major general) (1766–1840), general in the Indiana Militia
 Joseph Bartholomew (golf course designer) (1885–1971), African American architect, golfer, and golf course designer